William Scott may refer to:

Academics
 William A. Scott (psychologist), American social psychologist
 William Alphonsus Scott (1871–1921), Irish Roman Catholic architectural historian
 William Amasa Scott (1862–1944), American economist
 William Anderson Scott (1813–1885), Presbyterian minister, author, and educator
 William Berryman Scott (1858–1947), American paleontologist
 William Earl Dodge Scott (1852–1910), American ornithologist
 William Henry Scott (historian) (1921–1993), anthropologist and historian
 William Henry Scott (university president) (1840–1937), American academic administrator
 William Richard Scott (born 1932), American sociologist
 W. R. Scott (economist) (William Robert Scott, 1868–1940), political economist

Arts and entertainment
 Sir William Scott of Thirlestane (1645–1725), Scottish poet
 William Bell Scott (1811–1890), British poet and artist
 William Scott (artist) (1913–1989), British artist
 William Edouard Scott (1884–1964), African-American artist
 William Winfield Scott (1855–1935), American writer
 William Matthew Scott (1893–1964), pen name Will Scott, English author
 William Scott (actor) (1893–1967), American silent film actor
 Bill Scott (voice actor) (1920–1985), American voice actor and producer
 William Lee Scott (born 1973), American actor
 William Rufus Scott, employer of Margaret Wise Brown, publisher of W. R. Scott
 William B. Scott (magazine editor), American magazine editor

Law
 Sir William Scott (justice) (died 1350s), English lawyer and Chief Justice of the King's Bench
 Sir William Scott, Lord Balwearie (died 1532), Scottish judge
 William Scott (Irish lawyer) (1705–1776), Irish lawyer
 William Scott, 1st Baron Stowell (1745–1836), English judge and jurist
 William Scott (Missouri judge) (1804–1862), judge on the Missouri Supreme Court
 Will T. Scott (born 1947), judge on the Kentucky Supreme Court

Politics

Canada
 William Henry Scott (politician) (1799–1851), Canadian politician
 William James Scott (1812–1882), farmer and politician in Canada West
 William Hepburn Scott (1837–1881), Canadian lawyer and politician from Ontario
 William C. Scott (1921–1998), Canadian politician

United Kingdom
 William Scott (died 1434), MP for Kent
 Sir William Scott (Lord Warden) (1459–1524), English politician, Lord Warden of the Cinque Ports
 William Scott (MP for New Woodstock) (c. 1579–aft. 1611), MP for New Woodstock
 Sir William Scott, Lord Clerkington (died 1656), Scottish politician and judge
 Sir William Scott, 6th Baronet (1803–1871), Scottish Liberal politician
 William Montagu Douglas Scott, 6th Duke of Buccleuch, Scottish member of parliament and peer

United States
 William A. Scott, pilot of the Boeing 727 in the unsolved DB Cooper case of commercial air piracy
 William Grason Scott (died 1882), American politician
 William Lawrence Scott (1828–1891), US Representative from Pennsylvania and mayor of Erie, Pennsylvania
 W. Kerr Scott (1896–1958), American politician, Governor of North Carolina, US Senator
 William L. Scott (1915–1997), US Senator and Representative from Virginia
 William J. Scott (Illinois politician) (1926–1986), American politician
 William R. Scott, candidate in the 1980 United States Senate election in New York

Other countries
 William Scott (South Australian politician) (1795–1866), vigneron, businessman and politician in South Australia
 Jack Scott (New Zealand politician) (William John Scott, 1915–2001), New Zealand politician
 Alex Scott (politician) (William Alexander Scott, born 1940), Bermudian politician, Premier of Bermuda

Religion
 Maurus Scott (William Scott, died 1612), English Roman Catholic priest, missionary, and martyr
 William Scott (Anglican priest, born 1813) (1813–1872), English clergyman
 William Scott (astronomer and priest) (1825–1917), Church of England clergyman; colonial astronomer for New South Wales
 William Scott (archdeacon of Bombay) (died 1918), British priest
 Bill Scott (priest) (William Sievwright Scott, born 1946), British Anglican priest and Chaplain to the Queen of the United Kingdom
 Gene Scott (William Eugene Scott, 1929–2005), American pastor and television evangelist

Sports
 William Scott (jockey) (1797–1848), British jockey
 William Harvey Scott (died 1885), jockey, rode in 1840s Grand Nationals
 William Martin Scott (1870–1944), English international rugby union half back
 William Patrick Scott (1880–1948), Scottish international rugby union player
 Will Scott (1893–1972), English footballer and football manager
 William Scott (Australian cricketer) (1882–1965), Australian cricketer
 William Scott (cricketer, born 1845) (1845–1899), English cricketer 
 William Scott (English cricketer, born 1864) (1864–1920), English cricketer
 William Scott (English cricketer, born 1903) (1903–1989), English cricketer
 William Scott (Scottish cricketer) (1908–1971), Scottish cricketer
 William Scott (athlete) (1886–?), English long-distance runner who competed at the 1912 Summer Olympics

Other
 William Scott (Texas settler) (1784–1837), American settler in Baytown, Texas
 William Henry Scott (British Army officer) (1789–1868), British Army general
 William Scott (The Sleeping Sentinel) (1839–1862/40–1862), Union Army soldier during the American Civil War
 William R. Scott, Chief of Staff of the 1st Infantry Division in 1919
 William Shirley Scott (1856–1941), US Army general in World War I
 William Scott Shipbuilders, British shipyard based in Bristol during the mid-18th century
 William Gillbee Scott (1857–1930), English architect who designed the Gower Street Memorial Chapel (now the Chinese Church in London)
 William Bennett Scott Sr., American newspaper founder and publisher, mayor, and civil rights campaigner

See also
 Willie Scott (disambiguation)
 Bill Scott (disambiguation)
 William Scot, medieval bishop elect